Levubu is a village in the Makhado Local Municipality, part of the Vhembe District Municipality of Limpopo province, South Africa. It is located some 10 km south-west of Rembander. It takes its name from the Luvuvhu (or Levubu) River.

References

Populated places in the Makhado Local Municipality